Cho Sung-hwan (born 7 February 1943) is a former South Korean cyclist. He competed in the team time trial at the 1964 Summer Olympics.

References

1943 births
Living people
South Korean male cyclists
Olympic cyclists of South Korea
Cyclists at the 1964 Summer Olympics
Place of birth missing (living people)
Asian Games medalists in cycling
Cyclists at the 1966 Asian Games
Cyclists at the 1970 Asian Games
Medalists at the 1966 Asian Games
Medalists at the 1970 Asian Games
Asian Games gold medalists for South Korea
Asian Games silver medalists for South Korea
Asian Games bronze medalists for South Korea
20th-century South Korean people
21st-century South Korean people